Diving events at the 2019 Southeast Asian Games was held in New Clark City Aquatics Center, in Capas, Philippines from 6 to 7 December 2019. It is one of four aquatic sports at the Games, along with open water swimming, swimming, and water polo.

Malaysia won all 4 gold medals available.

Participating nations

  (3)
  (6)
  (5)
  (2)
  (5)
  (3)

Competition schedule
The following is the competition schedule for the diving competitions:

Medalists

Men

Women

Medal table

References

External links